The Bisset Hawkins Medal is a triennial award made by the Royal College of Physicians of London to acknowledge work done in the preceding ten years in advancing sanitary science or promoting public health. It is named after Francis Bisset Hawkins (1796–1884), a distinguished London physician and is presented after the Harveian Oration.

The medal, made of gold, was endowed by Captain Edward Wilmot Williams in 1896.

Medallists
Medallists have been:
 1899:  
 1902: William Henry Power
 1905: Patrick Manson
 1908: Sir 
 1911: Clement Dukes
 1914: Sir Ronald Ross for his researches on malaria
 1917: Sir Arthur Newsholme
 1920: Sir William Heaton Hamer
 1923: Sir Thomas Morison Legge
 1926: Sir Ambrose Thomas Stanton
 1929: Sir Edward Mellanby
 1932: Thomas Henry Craig Stevenson
 1935: Sir George Newman
 1938: Major Greenwood
 1941: Sir Frederick Norton Kay Menzies
 1944: Brigadier J. A. Sinton
 1947: Christopher Howard Andrewes
 1950: Sir William Wilson Jameson
 1953: William Norman Pickles
 1956: Graham Selby Wilson
 1959: Percy Stocks
 1962: Sir Richard Doll, for contributions to preventative medicine
 1965: Sir George Edward Godber
 1968: 
 1971: Sir Derrick Melville Dunlop
 1974: 
 1977: Major 
 1980: Jeremy Noah Morris 
 1983: Abraham Manie Adelstein
 1986: Geoffrey Arthur Rose
 1989: Sir Donald Acheson
 1992: Rosemary Rue
 1995: Sir Kenneth Charles Calman
 1998:
 2001: Kay-Tee Khaw
 2004: Michael Gideon Marmot
 2007:  
 2010: 
 2013: 
 2016: Sir Ian Gilmore

See also

 List of medicine awards
 Prizes named after people

References

British science and technology awards
Medicine awards
Awards established in 1896